The 1981 World Table Tennis Championships were held in Novi Sad (Yugoslavia) from April 14 to April 26, 1981.

Results

Team

Individual

References

External links
ITTF Museum

 
World Table Tennis Championships
World Table Tennis Championships
World Table Tennis Championships
Table tennis competitions in Yugoslavia
Table
Sports competitions in Novi Sad
April 1981 sports events in Europe
1981 in Serbian sport
20th century in Novi Sad